Companhia Meridional de Transportes was a Brazilian airline founded in 1944. In 1946, following the death of its owner on an air-crash, the airline went bankrupt.

History
Meridional was founded in 1944 and on October 4, 1945, started operating regular flights within the states of Rio de Janeiro and Espírito Santo. On December 19, 1945, one of its aircraft crashed killing all occupants, including the pilot and owner of the airline Álvaro Araújo. Months later, in March 1946, the airline declared bankruptcy.

Destinations
Meridional served the following cities:
Campos dos Goytacazes – Bartolomeu Lysandro Airport
Rio de Janeiro – Santos Dumont Airport
Vitória – Goiabeiras Airport
Volta Redonda was also one of its destinations, on the route Campos - Volta Redonda - Rio de Janeiro.

Fleet

Accidents and incidents
19 December 1945: an Avro Anson Mk. II registration PP-MTA crashed in the neighborhood of Itaipu, Niterói, killing all passengers and crew, including the pilot and owner of the airline, Álvaro Araújo.

See also

List of defunct airlines of Brazil

References

External links

Defunct airlines of Brazil
Airlines established in 1944
Airlines disestablished in 1946
1944 establishments in Brazil
1946 disestablishments in Brazil